The mode of electromagnetic radiation describes the field pattern of the propagating waves.  Electromagnetic modes are analogous to the normal modes of vibration in other systems, such as mechanical systems.

Some of the classifications of electromagnetic modes include;
 Free space modes
 Plane waves, waves in which the electric and magnetic fields are both orthogonal to the direction of travel of the wave.  These are the waves that exist in free space far from any antenna.
 Modes in waveguides and transmission lines
 Transverse modes, modes that have at least one of the electric field and magnetic field entirely in a transverse direction.
 Transverse electromagnetic mode (TEM), as with a free space plane wave, both the electric field and magnetic field are entirely transverse.
 Transverse electric (TE) modes, only the electric field is entirely transverse.  Also notated as H modes to indicate there is a longitudinal magnetic component.
 Transverse magnetic (TM) modes, only the magnetic field is entirely transverse.  Also notated as E modes to indicate there is a longitudinal electric component.
 Hybrid electromagnetic (HEM) modes, both the electric and magnetic fields have a component in the longitudinal direction.  They can be analysed as a linear superposition of the corresponding TE and TM modes.
 HE modes, hybrid modes in which the TE component dominates.
 EH modes, hybrid modes in which the TM component dominates.
 Longitudinal-section modes
 Longitudinal-section electric (LSE) modes, hybrid modes in which the electric field in one of the transverse directions is zero
 Longitudinal-section magnetic (LSM) modes, hybrid modes in which the magnetic field in one of the transverse directions is zero
 Modes in other structures
 Bloch modes, modes of Bloch waves; these occur in periodically repeating structures.

Mode names are sometimes prefixed with quasi-, meaning that the mode is not quite pure.  For instance, quasi-TEM mode has a small component of longitudinal field.

References

Bibliography 
 Connor, F R, Wave Transmission, Edward Arnold, 1972 .
 Chen, Wai Kai, The Electrical Engineering Handbook, Elsevier, 2004 .
 Edwards, Terry; Steer, Michael, Foundations for Microstrip Circuit Design, Wiley, 2016 .
 Yang, Jianke, Nonlinear Waves in Integrable and Non-integrable Systems, Society for Industrial and Applied Mathematics, 2010 .
 Zhang, Kequian; Li, Dejie, Electromagnetic Theory for Microwaves and Optoelectronics, Springer, 2013 .

Wave mechanics
Electromagnetic radiation
Microwave transmission